Go for a Take is a 1972 British comedy film, directed by Harry Booth and featuring Dennis Price, Bob Todd, Reg Varney, Norman Rossington, Sue Lloyd and Anouska Hempel. Debbie Russ reprises her role as the character "Tiger" from the television series Here Come the Double Deckers (1970–71). It was shot at Pinewood Studios with sets designed by the art director Lionel Couch. The film was released in the United States as Double Take.

Cast
 Reg Varney as Wilfred Stone
 Norman Rossington as Jack Foster
 Sue Lloyd as Angel Montgomery
 Dennis Price as Dracula, actor
 Julie Ege as April
 Patrick Newell as Generous Jim
 David Lodge as Graham
 Anouska Hempel as Suzi Eckmann
 Aubrey Morris as Director
 Bill Fraser as TV Studio Doorman
 Bob Todd as Security Man
 Jack Haig as Security Man
 Melvyn Hayes as Ambulance Man
 John Clive as Hotel Waiter
 Johnny Briggs as Assistant Director
 John Levene as Assistant Director
 David Prowse as Actor
 Penny Meredith as Harem Girl
 Debbie Russ as Tiger
 Peter Stephens as Director

Reception
The film was a box-office disappointment.

References

External links

Go for a Take at BFI
Go for a Take at Buses On Screen
Go for a Take at Reel Streets

1972 films
1972 comedy films
1970s English-language films
Films shot at Pinewood Studios
British comedy films
1970s British films